Latin University of Costa Rica, commonly called ULatina, is the largest private university in Costa Rica, with more than 16,000 students enrolled in undergraduate and graduate programs in Business, Education, Engineering, Health Sciences, and Social Sciences. The university is accredited by the National Council of Higher Education (CONESUP).

The university has two main campuses: Campus San Pedro, that is in San Pedro, San José, in the central area of private and state universities; and Campus Heredia (former Universidad Interamericana de Costa Rica) which is in the city of Heredia.

The university has 6 regional offices throughout Costa Rica: Grecia, Cañas, Santa Cruz, Guápiles, Pérez Zeledón and Ciudad Neily.

In October of 2020 the Universidad Latina and Arizona State University formed a partnership creating ULatina/ASU Dual Degrees, other aspects of this partnership include both online or at the ASU Campus opportunities, implementing English in all their programs, access to ASU faculty student and faculty abroad, and much more.

History

Campus San Pedro

Universidad Latina de Costa Rica was founded in 1979 as the “Collegium Latinum”, being part of the Autonomous University of Central America (UACA), Costa Rica's oldest private higher learning institution. The collegium separated from UACA ten years after its foundation, becoming a separate university.

On November 29, 1989, it was recognized as a university of higher education by the National Council of Higher Education Private University (CONESUP) in the session 146-89.

Since then the university has been known for its academic commitment at the courses offered to become the largest private university in the country. In 2005 it was acquired by Pro-Education Consortium; until June 2008 it was acquired by the network of private universities, Laureate International Universities, opening a new outlook of opportunities for university students, with a  global network to continue graduate studies.

Campus Heredia

Universidad Latina de Costa Rica (former Universidad Interamericana de Costa Rica) was founded in 1986 with 28 students in Business Administration, later implementing technical careers and undergraduate levels.

In 1997 the university moved to its new and current campus in Heredia. Since 2004 the school has been owned by the Laureate International Universities. In 2007, it expanded its facilities in Mercedes Tower on Paseo Colon in San Jose downtown. In 2010 the 'Universidad Interamericana de Costa Rica' merged with the 'Latina de Costa Rica' to form the new 'Universidad Latina de Costa Rica'.

Admissions

Universidad Latina de Costa Rica enrolls approximately 19,000 undergraduate and 2,000 graduate students. For undergraduate levels, students must have a High School Diploma granted by passing the national examinations by the MEP or its equivalent before enrolling. (Latin University of Costa Rica does not have an entrance examination.)

The university offers bachelor, licentiate, master and doctorate degrees.

Campuses

The geographical coverage of the university is expanded thanks to the integration of both campuses. It is present in 7 provinces with 10 regional offices, and 2 main campuses in Heredia and in San Pedro, San José.

Regional offices of the Universidad Latina de Costa Rica:
 North Pacific, in Santa Cruz and Cañas, Guanacaste
 Central Pacific, in the central county of the province of Puntarenas
 South Pacific, in San Isidro del General and the City of Paso Canoas in the province of Puntarenas
 Atlantic, in Turrialba, Guápiles and the central canton of the province of Limon
 North West, in Palmares and Grecia

Accredited degrees

The Universidad Latina de Costa Rica holds six official accredited degrees that have been accredited by the National Accreditation System for Higher Education (SINAES):

Bachelor of Business Administration with majors in:
 Marketing
 Finance
 Human Resources
 International Trade
Bachelor's in Public Relations
Bachelor's and Licentiate in Industrial Engineering
Bachelor's in Computer Systems Engineering
Bachelor's in Hospitality Management
Bachelor's and Licentiate in Nursing

In August 2016, the university officially presented its plan and commitment to make all degrees accredited by 2021.

Undergraduate degrees

Health Sciences
 Medicine
 Dentistry
 Optometry
 Physical Therapy
 Nursing
 Pharmacy
 Social Work
 Psychology

Social Sciences
 Law
 Journalism
 Advertising
 Advertise with major in
Creativity and Media Production
Advertising Strategy
 International Relations
 Public Relations
 Marketing Communication
 Media Production
 Graphic Design

Engineering Technologies
 Systems Engineering
 Software Engineering
 Information Technology for Business Management
 Network Engineering and Telematics

Hotel Management and Gastronomy
 Hotel Business Management
 Diploma in Culinary Arts
 Biology with major in Ecology and Sustainable Development
 Tourism with major in Hotels and Restaurants

Education
 Special Education with major in:
Emotional Disorders
Communication Disorders
Mental Retardation
Speech Therapy, Speech and Voice
Education I and II Cycle
 Education with major on
Integration for Students with Disabilities
Computer Education
 Bilingual Preschool
 Computer Science Education
 English Teaching
 Educational Administration

Economic Sciences
 Business Administration
 Business Administration with major in:
Marketing
Human Resources
Economics
International Trade
Finance
Computing
Insurance
Financial Institutions
Development of Your Own Company
Accounting
Economics

Engineering and Architecture
 Architecture
 Civil Engineering
 Electric Engineering
 Electronic Engineering
 Industrial Engineering
 Mechanical Engineering
 Electronics and Communications Engineering
 Electromechanical Engineering
 Design and Interior Decoration

References

External links
Website
Laureate International Universities Website

SINAES Accredited Degrees Website

Universities in Costa Rica